Don Walsh (born November 2, 1931) is an American oceanographer, explorer and marine policy specialist. He and Jacques Piccard were aboard the bathyscaphe Trieste when it made a record maximum descent into the Challenger Deep on January 23, 1960, the deepest point of the world's oceans.

Biography
Walsh has been associated with ocean science, engineering, and marine policy for more than fifty years. He was commissioned as an officer in the United States Navy upon graduation from the United States Naval Academy in 1954. He attained the rank of captain by the time he retired. He spent fifteen years at sea, mostly in submarines, and was a submarine commander. He also worked with ocean-related research and development for the U.S. Navy.

Serving as Dean of Marine Programs and Professor of Ocean Engineering at the University of Southern California, Walsh initiated and directed the university's Institute for Marine and Coastal Studies, and was a member of the board of directors for Omnithruster Inc., a manufacturer of marine maneuvering and auxiliary propulsion systems in nearby Santa Fe Springs. In 1989, his company, International Maritime Incorporated, contracted a joint venture with the P.P. Shirshov Institute of Oceanology to establish an underwater maintenance company, Soyuz Marine Service, which continues to operate in the Russian Federation. Walsh continues to support ocean sciences in his work on the Ocean Sciences Board at the National Academy of Sciences.

Honors
Walsh received a bachelor's degree in engineering from the U.S. Naval Academy, a Master's degree in Political Science from San Diego State University, and a master's degree and a PhD in physical oceanography from Texas A&M University. He was appointed by Presidents Carter and Reagan to the U.S. National Advisory Committee on Oceans and Atmosphere, was a member of the Law of the Sea Advisory Committee for the U.S. Department of State, and served as a member of the Marine Board of the U.S. National Research Council from 1990 to 1993.  In 2001, Walsh was elected to the National Academy of Engineering.  Walsh holds a faculty appointment at Oregon State University in the College of Earth, Ocean, and Atmospheric Sciences.

Walsh was named one of the world's great explorers by Life magazine. In the MIR submersible, he dived on the RMS Titanic, the German battleship Bismarck, and the Mid-Atlantic Ridge. He has spent more than five decades traveling the world conducting research in, on, and around the oceans.

In 1961, Walsh was chosen as one of 50 outstanding Americans of meritorious performance in the fields of endeavor, to be honored as a guest of honor to the first annual Banquet of the Golden Plate in Monterey, California. Honor was awarded by vote of the National Panel of Distinguished Americans of the Academy of Achievement.
   
On April 14, 2010, The National Geographic Society bestowed its greatest honor, the Hubbard Medal, on Walsh in a ceremony in Washington, D.C. at the National Geographic headquarters. The U.S. Navy awarded Walsh its Distinguished Public Service Award.

On September 22, 2020, The Marine Technology Society and The Society for Underwater Technology announced that Edith Widder was the inaugural recipient of their new joint MTS/SUT Captain Don Walsh Award for Ocean Exploration.

Today
Walsh lives with his wife, Joan, near Coquille, Oregon. He has managed a marine consulting business since 1976, and  conducted about five deep-sea expeditions per year. He remains active with the National Academy of Sciences and the Ocean Elders, and is on the faculty of Oregon State University.

It was reported in 2010 that Walsh visited the deep-sea submersible Jiaolong and its makers at the China Ship Scientific Research Center. The craft had "planted a Chinese flag on the bottom of the South China Sea during a two-mile-deep dive in June" as the Chinese program—which Walsh characterized as "very deliberate"—proceeded toward its ambitious goal of diving to 7,000 meters, or 4.35 miles, in 2012.

Walsh joined the team that oversaw the dive of the Deepsea Challenger mission, during which James Cameron dove solo to the bottom of the Challenger Deep, on March 26, 2012.

Walsh was the inspiration for Chris Wright's 2015 book No More Worlds to Conquer, and his interview constitutes the opening chapter. The book,  about moving on from the defining moment in one's life, was inspired by Walsh's answer to Wright's question: what came next after the Trieste dive? Walsh responded: "Well, a lot of people think I died."

Walsh was on board to congratulate Victor Vescovo when he completed his own record-breaking series of dives in the Challenger Deep in 2019.

In June 2020, Walsh's son Kelly dove to the bottom of the Challenger Deep with Vescovo, becoming the twelfth person to reach the deepest point in the ocean.

See also
Walsh Spur
 List of people who descended to Challenger Deep

References

Further reading

External links

1931 births
Living people
American oceanographers
Place of birth missing (living people)
People from Coos County, Oregon
Recipients of the Navy Distinguished Public Service Award
San Diego State University alumni
Texas A&M University alumni
United States Naval Academy alumni
United States Navy officers
Members of the United States National Academy of Engineering
Military personnel from Oregon